In mathematics, in the field of group theory, a subgroup of a group is termed a retract if there is an endomorphism of the group that maps surjectively to the subgroup and is identity on the subgroup.

The endomorphism itself (having this property) is an idempotent element in the transformation monoid of endomorphisms, so it is called an idempotent endomorphism or a retraction.

The following is known about retracts:

 A subgroup is a retract if and only if it has a normal complement. The normal complement, specifically, is the kernel of the retraction.
 Every direct factor is a retract. Conversely, any retract which is a normal subgroup is a direct factor.
 Every retract has the congruence extension property.
 Every regular factor, and in particular, every free factor, is a retract.

See also 
 Retraction (category theory)

References

Group theory
Subgroup properties